Scott Nichols is an American inventor and marketer who is often considered to be a leader in the effort to make fish farming more sustainable. Nichols was part of the process and promotion of using a yeast rich in essential omega-3s (EPA) as an alternative food source for farmed salmon. He is the recipient of the 2012 SeaWeb Innovation Award, the 2015 IntraFish Seafood International Marketer of the Year Award, a co-founder of Verlasso, and founder of Food's Future. He serves on the board of the Aquaculture Stewardship Council.

Before starting Food's Future, LLC, his own consulting firm for economically and environmentally sustainable aquaculture ventures, Nichols brought innovation to fish farming as a businessman and scientist. With the yeast, Nichols delivered a viable salmon diet option other than the environmentally unsustainable practice of relying on wild fish to provide the necessary omega-3s in a salmon's diet. By decreasing the ratio between wild fish consumed for salmon produced, the yeast rich in essential omega-3s reduced the dependency on wild fish.

Education and career

Education 

Nichols received his doctorate in biochemistry from UCLA. He also completed the Advanced Management Program at Wharton School of the University of Pennsylvania.

Employment 

In 2001, Nichols began his nearly 15-year career at DuPont as a researcher and new business developer. He is recognized as an inventor with over 40 patents.

Nichols co-founded Verlasso Harmoniously Raised Fish in 2006 as part of a project between DuPont and AquaChile to farm salmon in a sustainable way. During his tenure at Verlasso, Nichols helped bring about the transition to using enriched yeast to break aquaculture's reliance on wild fish to provide omega-3s required for salmon diets. This development served as one of the reasons Seafood Watch, a program from the Monterey Bay Aquarium that recognizes environmentally responsible fish farming practices, named Verlasso salmon a "good alternative" in 2013. Verlasso Atlantic Salmon were the first ocean-raised salmon to receive this distinction from Seafood Watch.

Changing the salmon's diet to include yeast reduced the number of wild fish necessary to raise healthy salmon. The Blue Marine Foundation noted the fish in/fish out ratio decreased from 3:1 to 1:1 when the omega-rich yeast replaced fish oils in salmon diets. This reduction did not stop discussion over whether the advancement was enough to shift public opinion on fish farming and modified fish food.

Nichols is an opponent of genetically modified salmon  due to his views that the method would damage the environment and fish ecosystems along with the future of food, and the salmon market. During a congressional hearing held on December 15, 2011, Nichols’ beliefs were mentioned during the discussion of benefits and problems caused by genetically engineering fish.

In 2015 after leaving Verlasso, Nichols started Food's Future, LLC, an aquaculture consultancy for economically and environmentally sustainable ventures. Food's Future is based on Nichols’ belief that the growing population brings new challenges to sustainable aquaculture. Nichols gained the support of the Global Aquaculture Alliance when he said changes in the climate and population demand improvements to fishing farm practices.

From 2005 to 2011, he served on the board of directors for the JRS Biodiversity Foundation.  In 2016, Nichols was elected to the board of the Aquaculture Stewardship Council.

Awards and honors 

 2012 SeaWeb Innovation Award  
 2015 IntraFish Seafood International Marketer of the Year

References 

University of California, Los Angeles alumni
Wharton School of the University of Pennsylvania alumni
Living people
Year of birth missing (living people)